Calvary Christian Church is a Pentecostal Christian church affiliated with Australian Christian Churches, the Assemblies of God in Australia.

Calvary Leadership College
Calvary Leadership College is the bible college of Calvary Christian Church, training future pastors and leaders from churches all over Australia and other countries. At current the leadership college offers diplomas in Church Leadership, Ministry and Business.

Calvary Christian College
Linked with the Townsville Church is Calvary Christian College, a K-12 independent Christian school founded in 1978. It has seen over 700 students pass through its doors since it was founded.

See also
Australian Christian Churches

References

External links
Calvary Christian College website
Australian Christian Churches website

Churches in Queensland
Pentecostal churches in Australia
Australian Christian Churches
Townsville
Sunshine Coast, Queensland
Christian organizations established in 1924
1924 establishments in Australia
Evangelical megachurches in Australia